Hanna Waag (1904–1995) was a German film actress. Amongst her performances were playing Queen Victoria in the 1933 film Waltz War and the title role in Lady Windermere's Fan in 1935. Of Jewish heritage, in 1937 she went into exile from the Nazi regime in Germany. Her husband, the Jewish art director Rudolf Bamberger was killed at Auschwitz.

Selected filmography
 The Burning Heart (1929)
 Marriage (1929)
 The Merry Widower (1929)
 Love's Carnival (1930)
 The King of Paris (1930)
 The Murderer Dimitri Karamazov (1931)
 The Brothers Karamazov (1931)
 Waltz War (1933)
 Farewell Waltz (1934)
 Music in the Blood (1934)
 The Gentleman Without a Residence (1934)
 Lady Windermere's Fan (1935)
 The Accusing Song (1936)

References

Bibliography
 Prawer, S.S. Between Two Worlds: The Jewish Presence in German and Austrian Film, 1910-1933. Berghahn Books, 2005.

External links

1904 births
1995 deaths
German film actresses
Jewish emigrants from Nazi Germany
People from Giessen
20th-century German actresses
Jewish German actresses